Renaissance Holiday is a studio album by the symphonic pop band Mannheim Steamroller.

Track listing
"Volte" – 2:22
"Ding Dong! Merrily On High" – 1:33
"Cos Colo Odo Sa" – 1:19
"Ballet" – 1:24
"I Saw Three Ships" – 1:26
"The King's Mistress" – 1:06
"In Dulci Jubilo" – 4:47
"En Avois/Tant Que Vivray" – 1:47
"Gigue" – 2:08
"Malle Sijmon" – 2:21
"Intrada" – 1:53
"Greensleeves" – 2:46
"Laura Suave" – 4:46
"Joseph Dearest, Joseph Mine" – 1:42
"Coventry Carol" – 1:46
"Wolseys Wilde" – 1:37
"New Yeeres Gift" – 1:19
"The Nymph's Dance/The Second Of Grays Inn" – 3:02
"There Is No Rose Of Such Virtue" – 1:18
"Lachrimae Antiquae" – 2:51
"Patapan/God Rest Ye Merry Gentlemen" – 1:39
"Gagliarda" – 1:18
"Bouree" – 1:39
"Lo, How A Rose E'er Blooming" – 1:56
"Bateman's Masque" – 2:18
"M. George Whitehead and His Almand" – 1:45
"The Merry Bells of Speyer" – 1:22

References

1998 albums
Christmas albums by American artists
Mannheim Steamroller albums
American Gramaphone albums